Praveen Jordan (born 26 April 1993) is an Indonesian badminton player who specialises in doubles. He is a two-time All England Open champion in mixed doubles, winning in 2016 with Debby Susanto and in 2020 with Melati Daeva Oktavianti. He has played for the badminton club PB Djarum since 2008.

Career

Junior career 
Jordan participated in 2011 Badminton Asia Junior Championships in Lucknow, India. In the mixed team event, he played in the men's doubles along with Rangga Yave Rianto. In the first round they won their match, with Indonesia defeating Nepal 5–0. He and Rianto played back against Hong Kong in the third round, winning their match and helping Indonesia win 4–1. In the quarter-finals Jordan and Rianto won their match and helped Indonesia beat Japan 3–2. In the semi-finals they lost to the Malaysian team 1–3, and the team won the bronze medal. In the individual event, he played in two categories, in the men's doubles with Rianto, and in the mixed doubles with Tiara Rosalia Nuraidah. As the top seed in the men's doubles he was only able to reach the quarter-finals after being defeated by a Chinese Taipei pair; and then he won a bronze medal in the mixed doubles after losing to a Chinese pair in the semi-finals.

Senior career

2010–2012 
Jordan started his senior career as a PB Djarum player in 2010, playing at several international tournaments in two specialties: men's and mixed doubles.

2013 

In 2013 Jordan was paired with Vita Marissa, winning several international tournaments together. In the Korea Open they lost in the first round to Muhammad Rijal and Debby Susanto after coming through the qualifying rounds. They then defeated third seeds Rijal and Susanto in the second round of the Malaysia Open and Chinese fifth seeds Zhang Nan and Tang Jinhua. Jordan and Marissa then lost to Danish pair Joachim Fischer Nielsen and Christinna Pedersen in the semi-finals. They also reached the semifinals of the Singapore Open before losing to Tontowi Ahmad and Liliyana Natsir. At the BWF Grand Prix Gold and Grand Prix tournament level, they won three titles in New Zealand, Malaysia, and Indonesia.

2014 
After the end of his successful in the 2013 season, Badminton Association of Indonesia called him up to join the national team, partnering him with Debby Susanto. This was his first time joined the Indonesia national training centre. Jordan and Susanto then reached their first finals as a pair in the Malaysia Grand Prix Gold. In September, he and his partner stepped on the Asian Games podium, after clinched the bronze medal in the mixed doubles.

2015 
Jordan started the 2015 season with partner Debby Susanto. They reached the finals in the Malaysia Masters Grand Prix Gold tournament, but lost to Danish pair Joachim Fischer Nielsen and Christinna Pedersen. They also reached the finals of Thailand Open Grand Prix Gold, but lost to Korean pair Choi Sol-gyu and Eom Hye-won.  They then reached their first ever BWF Superseries finals in the French Open, and finished as runner-up lost to Ko Sung-hyun and Kim Ha-na of South Korea. In December, they also the finals of Indonesian Masters Grand Prix Gold, but lost to their teammate Tontowi Ahmad and Liliyana Natsir.

2016 
In January, Jordan with partner Debby Susanto won the Syed Modi International Grand Prix Gold held in India. In March, they won their first All England title defeating Danish pair Joachim Fischer Nielsen and Christinna Pedersen.

Jordan competed in 2016 Summer Olympics in Rio de Janeiro with partner Debby Susanto. They became the runner-up of Group A, proceeding to the knocked-out stage. They lost at the quarter-finals to their country mate and eventual gold medalists, Tontowi Ahmad and Liliyana Natsir.

In November, they lost in the finals of Hong Kong Open Super Series by their teammate Tontowi Ahmad and Liliyana Natsir.

2017 
In March, Jordan with partner Debby Susanto lost the finals of Swiss Open Grand Prix Gold from Thai pair Dechapol Puavaranukroh and Sapsiree Taerattanachai. In June, they lost the finals of Australian Open Super Series from Chinese pair Zheng Siwei and Chen Qingchen. In September, they won the finals of Korea Open Super Series from Chinese pair Wang Yilyu and Huang Dongping.

2018–2019 
After the retirement of Debby Susanto, Jordan was paired with Melati Daeva Oktavianti. They lost to Chinese pair Zheng Siwei and Huang Yaqiong in the second round of the Malaysia Masters. They then became runners-up at the 2018 India Open. They finished the season ranked as world  number 15.

In 2019, Jordan and Oktavianti lost again twice in a row at the India Open from Chinese pair Wang Yilyu and Huang Dongping. In May, they lost at the New Zealand Open from Malaysian pair Chan Peng Soon and Goh Liu Ying. In June, they reached third finals of the year at the Australian Open but lost to Wang and Huang again. In July, they reached the fourth finals at the Japan Open but had to lose from Wang and Huang again.

In October 2019, they won their first BWF World Tour title with Oktavianti at the Denmark Open. The duo upset the current World Champions Zheng Siwei and Huang Yaqiong in the quarter-finals, and defeated world number 2 Wang and Huang in the finals. This victory was their first win over them, bringing their head-to-head record to 1–6. A week later, the duo again overcame the world number 1 Zheng and Huang to claim the French Open title. Jordan and Oktavianti have continued on the upward track this season, breaking into the top 5 of the BWF world ranking.

2020–2022 
In 2020, Jordan won his second All England Open title. Partnered with Oktavianti, they defeated Thai pair Dechapol Puavaranukroh and Sapsiree Taerattanachai in the final.

In January 2021, Jordan and his partner, Oktavianti, lost at the Yonex Thailand Open from Thai pair Puavaranukroh and Taerattanachai in the final. In July, they competed at the 2020 Summer Olympics, but they were eliminated in the quarter-finals. In November, they lost at the Hylo Open in Germany from Thai pair Puavaranukroh and Taerattanachai in the final.

In 2022, Jordan and his partner, Oktavianti, played at the Asian Championships in Manila. They reached the semi-finals and won a bronze medal, after the pair had to retire in the middle of the match due to a hip injury suffered by Jordan.

2023 
In January, Jordan and his partner, Oktavianti, comeback to court at the Indonesia Masters, but had to lose in the first round from Chinese pair Feng Yanzhe and Huang Dongping.

In March, they competed in the European tour, but unfortunately lost in the second round of German Open from 5th seed Chinese pair Feng Yanzhe and Huang Dongping.

Awards and nominations

Achievements

Asian Games 
Mixed doubles

Asian Championships 
Mixed doubles

Southeast Asian Games 
Mixed doubles

Asian Junior Championships 
Mixed doubles

BWF World Tour (3 titles, 7 runners-up) 
The BWF World Tour, which was announced on 19 March 2017 and implemented in 2018, is a series of elite badminton tournaments sanctioned by the Badminton World Federation (BWF). The BWF World Tour is divided into levels of World Tour Finals, Super 1000, Super 750, Super 500, Super 300, and the BWF Tour Super 100.

Mixed doubles

BWF Superseries (2 titles, 3 runners-up) 
The BWF Superseries, which was launched on 14 December 2006 and implemented in 2007, was a series of elite badminton tournaments, sanctioned by the Badminton World Federation (BWF). BWF Superseries levels were Superseries and Superseries Premier. A season of Superseries consisted of twelve tournaments around the world that had been introduced since 2011. Successful players were invited to the Superseries Finals, which were held at the end of each year.

Mixed doubles

  BWF Superseries Finals tournament
  BWF Superseries Premier tournament
  BWF Superseries tournament

BWF Grand Prix (4 titles, 5 runners-up) 
The BWF Grand Prix had two levels, the Grand Prix and Grand Prix Gold. It was a series of badminton tournaments sanctioned by the Badminton World Federation (BWF) and played between 2007 and 2017.

Mixed doubles

  BWF Grand Prix tournament
  BWF Grand Prix Gold tournament

BWF International Challenge/Series (1 title) 
Men's doubles

  BWF International Challenge tournament
  BWF International Series tournament

Performance timeline

National team 
 Junior level

 Senior level

Individual competitions

Junior level 
 Boys' doubles

 Mixed doubles

Senior level

Men's doubles

Mixed doubles

Record against selected opponents 
Mixed doubles results against World Superseries finalists, World Superseries Finals semifinalists, World Championships semifinalists, and Olympic quarter-finalists paired with:

Debby Susanto 

  Liu Cheng & Bao Yixin 3–2
  Lu Kai & Huang Yaqiong 2–2
  Xu Chen & Ma Jin 2–2
  Zhang Nan & Li Yinhui 1–0
  Zhang Nan & Zhao Yunlei 1–8
  Zheng Siwei & Chen Qingchen 0–4
  Joachim Fischer Nielsen & Christinna Pedersen 6–6
  Chris Adcock & Gabby Adcock 0–5
  Reginald Lee Chun Hei & Chau Hoi Wah 5–4
  Riky Widianto & Richi Puspita Dili 2–0
  Tontowi Ahmad & Liliyana Natsir 1–4
  Kenta Kazuno & Ayane Kurihara 2–0
  Ko Sung-hyun & Kim Ha-na 4–4
  Yoo Yeon-seong & Chang Ye-na 1–0
  Chan Peng Soon & Goh Liu Ying 1–1
  Robert Mateusiak & Nadieżda Zięba 0–1

Vita Marissa 

  Xu Chen & Ma Jin 0–1
  Zhang Nan & Zhao Yunlei 0–1
  Joachim Fischer Nielsen & Christinna Pedersen 0–2
  Chris Adcock & Gabby Adcock 0–1
  Reginald Lee Chun Hei & Chau Hoi Wah 0–1
  Riky Widianto & Richi Puspita Dili 2–1
  Tontowi Ahmad & Liliyana Natsir 1–1
  Ko Sung-hyun & Kim Ha-na 1–0
  Yoo Yeon-seong & Chang Ye-na ''0–1
  Chan Peng Soon & Goh Liu Ying 1–0
  Sudket Prapakamol & Saralee Thungthongkam '1–0

References

External links 
 
 

1993 births
Living people
People from Bontang
Sportspeople from East Kalimantan
Indonesian male badminton players
Badminton players at the 2016 Summer Olympics
Badminton players at the 2020 Summer Olympics
Olympic badminton players of Indonesia
Badminton players at the 2014 Asian Games
Asian Games bronze medalists for Indonesia
Asian Games medalists in badminton
Medalists at the 2014 Asian Games
Competitors at the 2015 Southeast Asian Games
Competitors at the 2019 Southeast Asian Games
Southeast Asian Games gold medalists for Indonesia
Southeast Asian Games medalists in badminton
20th-century Indonesian people
21st-century Indonesian people